Mark Natta (born 28 November 2002), is an Australian professional footballer who plays as a central defender for the Newcastle Jets.

References

External links
Mark Natta player stats Ultimate A League

2002 births
Living people
Australian soccer players
Association football defenders
Sutherland Sharks FC players
APIA Leichhardt FC players
Western Sydney Wanderers FC players
Newcastle Jets FC players
National Premier Leagues players
A-League Men players
Australian people of Italian descent